Tom Brown's School Museum is a local museum in the village of Uffington (near Faringdon), Oxfordshire, England. It was opened in 1984.

The museum covers local history, archaeology, the author Thomas Hughes (1822–1896, author of Tom Brown's School Days), the poet laureate Sir John Betjeman (1906–1984, who lived in the village), and the nearby ancient Uffington White Horse. The museum is close to the churchyard and is housed in a 17th-century schoolroom that was featured in the novel Tom Brown's School Days.

See also
 List of museums in Oxfordshire
 Museum of Oxford

References

External links

 Tom Brown's School Museum website
 

Brown, Tom
School museums
Local museums in Oxfordshire
Archaeological museums in Oxfordshire
Literary museums in England
Vale of White Horse
Museums established in 1984
1984 establishments in England